Harry Williams may refer to:

Business
 Harry Palmerston Williams (1889–1936), American businessman
 Harry E. Williams, founder of the Williams Manufacturing Company
 Harry Williams, owner and operator of Hedonism Resorts
 Harry L. Williams, president and CEO of the Thurgood Marshall College Fund

Music
 Harry Williams (songwriter) (1879–1922), American composer and lyricist
 Harry Williams (1927–1991), Aboriginal Australian singer who sung in the musical duo Harry and Wilga Williams
 Harry Williams, singer of American R&B band Bloodstone

Sports

Association football
 Harry Williams (footballer, born 1875) (1875–?), English footballer with Small Heath
 Harry Williams (footballer, born 1883) (1883–?), English footballer with Bolton Wanderers, Burnley and Manchester United
 Harry Williams (footballer, born 1898) (1898–1980), English footballer with Sunderland, Chesterfield, Manchester United and Brentford
 Harry Williams (footballer, born 1929), English footballer
 Harry Williams (soccer, born 1951) (born 1951), Australian soccer player at the 1974 FIFA World Cup
 Harry Williams (footballer, born 1996), English footballer with Sacramento Republic

Baseball
 Harry Williams (first baseman) (1890–1963), American baseball player for the New York Yankees c. 1913
 Harry Williams (third baseman), American Negro leagues baseball player
 Harry Williams (infielder) (1905–1964), American Negro leagues baseball player

Other sports
 Harry Williams (American football) (born 1982), American football wide receiver
 Harry Williams (cricketer) (1892–1967), English cricketer
 Harry Williams (golfer), Australian golfer
 Harry Williams (rugby union) (born 1991), English rugby player with Exeter Chiefs

Other
 Harry Williams (priest) (1919–2006), British monk and theologian, Dean of Trinity College, Cambridge
 Henry James "Harry" Williams, credited as co-writer of "It's a Long Way to Tipperary"
 T. Harry Williams (1909–1979), American historian based in Louisiana
 Harry Craven Williams, Welsh Anglican priest

See also
 Harry Gregson-Williams (born 1961), British composer, orchestrator, conductor and music producer
 Henry Williams (disambiguation)
 Harold Williams (disambiguation)
 Harrison Williams (disambiguation)